Chancy is an unincorporated community in Quitman County, Mississippi. Chancy is located on Mississippi Highway 321, south of Lambert.

References

Unincorporated communities in Quitman County, Mississippi
Unincorporated communities in Mississippi